Charles Olmstead may refer to:

 Charles Sanford Olmstead (1853–1918), bishop of the Episcopal Diocese of Colorado
 Charles H. Olmstead (1837–1926), American Confederate Army officer
 Charles Tyler Olmstead (1842–1924), bishop of the Episcopal Diocese of Central New York

See also
Charles Olmsted (disambiguation)